BHT1 is a Bosnian national public mainstream TV channel operated by Radio and Television of Bosnia and Herzegovina (BHRT). The channel broadcasts on a daily basis for 20 hours in one of the two alphabets (Bosnian Latin alphabet and  Bosnian Cyrillic alphabet). This television channel broadcasts a variety of programmes such as news, talk shows, documentaries, sports, movies, mosaic, children's programs, etc. BHT1 also broadcasts teletext services (TXT BHT1).

Current line-up

News programme
Dnevnik - main news in 12:00 and 19:00
Vijesti - news, runs in 07:00, 10:00, around 14:00, and around 22:00

Regionalni dnevnik - (Regional news) local news from Bosnian major cities (Sarajevo, Banja Luka, Bihać, Zenica,...)
Jutro za sve - (Morning For All), morning programme
BHT1 Uživo (BHT1 Live), programme about discussing current topics with guests
Govor tišine - (Speech of silence), weekly review from other TV shows (like news) that are broadcast in sign language
Global - magazine about world news, business and politics
 Euroimpuls - programme dedicated to Accession of Bosnia and Herzegovina to the European Union
 
 Agro-Ekologija - (Agroecology), news from around the world in terms of ecology
 TV Liberty

Talk shows
 
 
 Jedan - (One), interview with various guests from Bosnia and Herzegovina

Music and Entertainment

Inbox - magazine about music and entertainment

 

Konačno petak! - (Finally Friday!), live entertainment show, hosted by famous bh. television anchor Maja Miralem
BH gastro kutak - (BH gastro corner) cooking show with guests who prepare traditional Bosnian cuisine
BHRT Top 15 - weekly top 15 show of the latest song hits from Bosnia and Herzegovina
BHRT Plesna lista - (BHRT Dance List), weekly top 15 show of the latest dance hits from around the world
Narodni studio - (Folk Studio), music programme about the latest folksong hits
Corner - music show where the MP BHRT band perform covers of well-known domestic and worldwide hits along with a guest
Tamburaši i Vi - (Tambourines and You), music show where the MP BHRT Tambourine Orchestra perform covers of well-known folksongs along with a guest

Sports programme
 
 
 

 
BHT Sport - sport news
Matches of Bosnian basketball clubs
Matches of Bosnian handball clubs

Documentary programme
 
 Putevi zdravlja - (Ways of Health), magazine about health, herbs, beauty and wellness
 Smanji gas! - (Slow Down!), TV show dedicated to news from the auto industry, auto show, advice on car maintenance and stories about Bosnian auto racing
Nova avantura - (New Adventure), documentary show in which natural curiosities and geological research are presented
Potrošački smjer - (Consumer Way), TV show about consumer rights
Identiteti - (Identities), TV show about national minorities

Culture programme
 Dimenzija više - weekly TV programme that presents all major cultural events in Bosnia and Herzegovina (from museums, exhibitions, book presentations, concerts of classical music, theater, and up to the opera and ballet)
 Dimenzija više Specijal - TV programme that presents all major cultural events during special festivals such as: Sarajevo Film Festival, International Theatre Festival MESS Sarajevo and International festival Sarajevo winter.

Children's programme 
 

Frenderi - educational show with multiple seasons about: the geography of Europe and Bosnia and Herzegovina, traffic, letters of the alphabet, numbers, and protecting the environment

Domaća Zadaća - (Homework) - special educational series
Terminal 26 - computer science magazine
Prijatelji životinja - (Friends of Animals), magazine about animals
Roditeljski sastanak - (Parental Meeting), family magazine

Uradi Sam, Uradi Sama - (Do It Yourself)
Lubenica - (Watermelon)
Latif i Mravko Travko
BHT Slagalica - (BHT Puzzle)
Mini school
Dileme - (Dilemmas), a dialogue show where young people and professionals discuss about challenges everyone faces every day
Dinousaur Train - in Bosnian: "Voz Dinosaura", dubbed
old Yugoslav children's shows such as: Mak i Zak (Mac & Zack), Nedeljni Zabavnik (Sunday Entertainer), etc.

Foreign series
Yaprak Dökümü - in Bosnian: "Kad lišće pada"
 
 
 
 

Kayip - in Bosnian: "Druga strana istine"
Filinta bir osmanli polisiyesi - in Bosnian: "Filinta"

Beautiful Beijing - in Bosnian: "Taj divni Peking", documentary show about Beijing
Deutsche Welle shows Tomorrow Today and Shift
Other foreign documentaries and movies that appear from time to time
Old Yugoslav movies that also appear from time to time

See also
Radio and Television of Bosnia and Herzegovina
 BH Radio 1 - National public radio service
 MP BHRT - Music Production of BHRT

References

External links
Official Site

Radio and Television of Bosnia and Herzegovina
Television stations in Bosnia and Herzegovina
Multilingual broadcasters
Television channels and stations established in 1992
Mass media in Sarajevo